Teresa the Thief is a 1973 commedia all'italiana film directed by Carlo Di Palma. It is based on the novel Memorie di una ladra written by Dacia Maraini in 1972.

Cast 
Monica Vitti: Teresa
Stefano Satta Flores: Ercoletto
Michele Placido: Tonino Santità
Carlo Delle Piane: Occhilustri
Denise Peron
Luciana Turina
Isa Danieli
Geraldine Hooper
Fiorenzo Fiorentini
Anna Bonaiuto
Armando Brancia
Franco Diogene

References

External links

1973 films
Italian comedy films
1973 comedy films
Commedia all'italiana
Films scored by Riz Ortolani
Films with screenplays by Age & Scarpelli
1970s Italian-language films
1970s Italian films